The Neajlovel is a left tributary of the river Neajlov in Romania. It flows into the Neajlov in the village Neajlovu.

References

Rivers of Romania
Rivers of Argeș County
Rivers of Dâmbovița County